CKH may refer to

Eastern Nazarene College, Campus Kinder Haus
CKH, stock symbol for SEACOR Holdings
Cook Islands, ITU code CKH